David Lewis Gifford (September 18, 1844 – January 13, 1904) was a Union Army soldier in the American Civil War who received the U.S. military's highest decoration, the Medal of Honor. He was awarded the Medal of Honor, for extraordinary heroism shown on May 24, 1864, while serving as a Private with Company B, 4th Massachusetts Volunteer Cavalry, at Ashepoo River, South Carolina. His Medal of Honor was issued on January 21, 1897. He received his Medal of Honor following the steamer the USS Boston running aground on an Oyster bed, leaving 400 individuals within range of Confederate artillery. Gifford and four other men - led by George W. Brush - manned a small boat and ferried stranded soldiers to a safe area.

Gifford was born in Dartmouth, Massachusetts on September 18, 1844, and joined the Army in December 1863. He was transferred to the Navy in June 1864, and was discharged with the rank of ordinary seaman in August 1865.

In 1876 Gifford was the captain on a whaling ship that saved the lives of several passengers on the Strathmore, which had run aground near Madagascar in the Indian Ocean.

Gifford died at the age of 59, on January 13, 1904, and was buried at the South Dartmouth Cemetery in Dartmouth, Massachusetts. Where he was honored with a marker. He was additionally honored with a statue outside the Dartmouth Middle School, a project spearheaded by Dartmouth natives Doris Copley, and Beverly Morrison Glennon. His heroics were also the subject of a local Television film in Dartmouth.

Medal of Honor citation

See Also 
• List of American Civil War Medal of Honor recipients: G–L

References

External links

1844 births
1904 deaths
Burials in Massachusetts
People of Massachusetts in the American Civil War
Union Army soldiers
United States Army Medal of Honor recipients
American Civil War recipients of the Medal of Honor
People from Dartmouth, Massachusetts
Union Navy sailors